Justin Wilkes is a film and television producer. Best known for producing documentary What Happened, Miss Simone? that earned him Academy Award for Best Documentary Feature nomination at 88th Academy Awards with co-producer Amy Hobby and director Liz Garbus.

Filmography

 Fade to Black  
 Iconoclasts
 Oprah's Master Class   
 Under African Skies  
 Jay Z, Made in America
 What Happened, Miss Simone?
 Park Bench with Steve Buscemi
 America Divided
 Stan Against Evil
 Mars'''
 Rebuilding Paradise Julia Light & Magic We Feed People''

References

External links 
 

Year of birth missing (living people)
Living people
British film producers